Rigisamus, also Rigisamos, was a deity in Gaulish and Celtic mythology who, according to the Interpretatio Romana, was connected with Mars.

Mythology and Etymology 
Rigisamus is mentioned in two inscriptions, one in Bourges (Cher department, Region Center-Val de Loire in France), and the other in West Cocker (in Yeovil, district of South Somerset in England) together with a picture of God and the following text: 

 Deodorant Marti | Rigisamo | Iu (v) entius | Sabinus | v (otum) s (olvit) l (aetus) l (ibens) m (erito)
 ("Juventius Sabinus gladly and deservedly fulfilled the vow for the god Mars Rigisamus")

The name Rigisamus is derived from a reconstructed Proto-Indo-European root * rīg ("king", "royal") and a second, * -samo , * samali ("unique"). Rigisamus would therefore mean "the most royal", "king of kings". The Irish word rí [ R'iː ] and the Gallic  rix [rīg-s ] (both also mean “king”) are directly related to this .

It is not known which properties of Mars are attributed to Rigisamus.

See also 

 List of Celtic deities
 Ancient Celtic religion
Gaulish gods

References 

Gaulish gods